The Abel test is a method developed by the British chemist Frederick Abel (1827–1902) to determine the flash point of a given sample of petroleum in order to ascertain the temperature at which it could safely be stored or used.

References

Chemical tests
Laws in the United Kingdom